Afro@Digital is a 2002 documentary film.

Synopsis 
Afro@Digital explores how digital technology has changed the lives of Africans. For instance, a marabout explains that he no longer replies by letter to questions from Africans living abroad: he uses his cell phone. Another eloquent illustration of the digital revolution in Africa is the proliferation of Internet cafés full of young people. It raises challenging questions about the use of technology in various domains, and in documenting humanity's memory and also asks how digital technology might be used in the service of African people tomorrow.

Awards 
 Zimbabwe 2004

References 

2002 films
Creative Commons-licensed documentary films
Democratic Republic of the Congo documentary films
2002 documentary films
Documentary films about the Internet
Internet in Africa
Documentary films about Africa